Steven Simring (born May 24, 1939, in The Bronx, New York) is a psychiatrist and co-author of several books. He currently serves as an associate professor and vice chairman of the department of psychiatry at UMDNJ-New Jersey Medical School.

Books written by Simring
Making Marriage Work For Dummies, w/ Sue Klavans Simring and Gene Buscar, Publisher: John Wiley & Sons, Ltd., April 2011.
Psychiatry Recall, 210 pages, with Barbara Fadem, Lippincott Williams & Wilkins, December 2003.
High-Yield Psychiatry, 2nd Edition, 151 pages, with Barbara Fadem, Lippincott Williams & Wilkins, December 2003.
Psychiatry Recall PDA: Powered by Skyscape, Inc., Recall Series, 151 pages, with Barbara Fadem, Lippincott Williams & Wilkins, 2004.
The Compatibility Quotient, 245 pages, w/ Sue Klavans Simring and William Proctor, Fawcett Columbine, 2004.
Blindspots: Stop Repeating Mistakes That Mess Up Your Love Life, Career, Finances, Marriage, and Happiness (Hardcover) with Sue Klavans Simring and Florence Isaacs, 239 pages, M. Evans and Company Publishing, August 2005.
How to Win Back the One You Love, w/ Eric Webber, Publisher: Bantam Publishers, 1984.
Race Trap: Smart Strategies For Effective Racial Communication In Business And In Life, w/ Robert L. Johnson and Gene Buscar, Hardcover edition, 239 pages, HarperBusiness Publishing, November 14, 2000.

References

External links
http://www.webmd.com/steven-simring Dr. Steven Simring profile at WebMD

1939 births
Physicians from New York City
American psychiatrists
American psychoanalysts
New York University alumni
Living people
American male writers